Paratephritis xenia is a species of tephritid or fruit flies in the genus Paratephritis of the family Tephritidae.

Distribution
China, Myanmar.

References

Tephritinae
Insects described in 1938
Diptera of Asia